Afrocanthium pseudoverticillatum is a species of flowering plant in the family Rubiaceae. It is found from Somalia, Kenya, Tanzania and Mozambique.

References

External links
World Checklist of Rubiaceae
 World Conservation Monitoring Centre 1998.  Canthium robynsianum.   2006 IUCN Red List of Threatened Species.   Downloaded on 21 August 2007.

Vanguerieae
Flora of Somalia
Flora of Kenya
Flora of Tanzania
Flora of Mozambique
Vulnerable flora of Africa
Taxonomy articles created by Polbot